Henry van Hien (1857 or 1858 – 4 July 1928) was a Gold Coast merchant, politician, and nationalist leader.

Biography

Early life and business career

Van Hien was born in Elmina to Carel Hendrik David van Hien (1833–1864), a government official and Acting Governor of the Dutch Gold Coast, and Elizabeth Essuman (ca. 1839–1930), sister of Willem Essuman Pietersen. He was educated at the Cape Coast Government School and, according to family tradition, went to the Netherlands and the United Kingdom for further education (this was not uncommon for the Euro-African elite in Cape Coast and Elmina). When he returned to the Gold Coast in 1878, he began working as an agent for F. & A. Swanzy at Shama, and later for Alexander Miller Bros. at Accra and Winneba. He was partner in the firm of his maternal uncle Willem Essuman Pietersen at Cape Coast, and managed it after his uncle's death in 1914. In his later years he was based in Accra.

Political career
In 1923, Van Hien became a member of the Cape Coast Chamber of Commerce. A year later, he was installed as temporary unofficial member of the Gold Coast Legislative Council. From 1925 until 1927, he served as extraordinary member of the said Legislative Council, and later he served as member of the Cape Coast Town Council.

Van Hien served as President of the Aborigines' Rights Protection Society and was a founder of the National Congress of British West Africa, for which he also served as president.

Educationism
Van Hien actively promoted the establishment of educational institutions in Cape Coast. He was co-founder of Achimota College and founder of St. Monica's School.

Personal life
Van Hien married Marian Victoria Plange. In his lifetime, he has both been a member of the Wesleyan Methodist Church and Chancellor of the Anglican Church at Cape Coast. Van Hien was also a freemason.

Van Hien and Plange did not have any children. Van Hien died on 4 July 1928 of cerebral haemorrhage and was buried in either the Sekondi Road Cemetery or the Anglican Cemetery in Cape Coast. Van Hien's cousin Kobina Sekyi was his heir.

Notes

References
 

Dutch Gold Coast people
1928 deaths
People from Elmina
Year of birth uncertain
Ghanaian people of Dutch descent